Magazine Road is a major thoroughfare in the city of George Town in Penang, Malaysia. The one-way road, one of the busiest in the city centre, runs along some of George Town's major landmarks, including Komtar and 1st Avenue Mall.

The road was created towards the end of the 19th century as part of an urban residential quarter known as the Seven Streets Precinct. Straits Eclectic-style shophouses can still be seen along the road, standing alongside more modern high-rises.

The western end of Magazine Road joins the similarly-named Magazine Circus, which also intersects four other major roads within the city centre - Penang Road, Macalister Road, Dato Keramat Road and Brick Kiln Road.

Etymology 

Magazine Road was named after a gunpowder depot that once existed at the site where Gama Departmental Store now stands. The road is also known as Thaû-tiaû-lơ̄ in Penang Hokkien, implying Magazine Road's geographical location as the first (northernmost) street within the Seven Streets Precinct.

History 
Magazine Road was laid out in the late 19th century as part of the Seven Streets Precinct, a residential area inhabited by ethnic Chinese. The growing population of George Town led to the expansion of the city in the southerly direction across the then Prangin Canal, compelling the British authorities to create grid-like streets within the Seven Streets Precinct. Straits Eclectic-style terrace houses were built within the precinct to cater to the working- and middle-class Chinese.

Up until the late 20th century, the Seven Streets Precinct, including Magazine Road, was rife with crime and triad activities, and generally shunned by the Peranakans. It was only in the 1970s when the road witnessed more modern forms of development, starting with the construction of Komtar.

Landmarks 
 Komtar
 1st Avenue Mall

Hotels 
 Hotel Jen
 St. Giles Wembley Hotel

See also 
 List of roads in George Town

References 

Roads in Penang
George Town, Penang